In mathematics and computer science, the syntactic monoid  of a formal language  is the smallest monoid that recognizes the language .

Syntactic quotient
The free monoid on a given set is the monoid whose elements are all the strings of zero or more elements from that set, with string concatenation as the monoid operation and the empty string as the identity element. These are called quotients, and one may define right or left quotients, depending on which side one is concatenating.

Similarly, the left quotient is

Syntactic equivalence

The right syntactic equivalence is the equivalence relation

.

Similarly, the left syntactic equivalence is

.

Observe that the right syntactic equivalence is a left congruence with respect to string concatenation and vice versa; i.e.,  for all .

The syntactic congruence or Myhill congruence is defined as

.

The definition extends to a congruence defined by a subset  of a general monoid .

The syntactic congruence is compatible with concatenation in the monoid, in that one has

for all . Thus, the syntactic quotient is a monoid morphism, and induces a quotient monoid

.

A group language is one for which the syntactic monoid is a group.

Myhill–Nerode theorem

The Myhill–Nerode theorem states: a language  is regular if and only if the family of quotients  is finite, or equivalently, the left syntactic equivalence  has finite index (meaning it partitions  into finitely many equivalence classes).

This theorem was first proved by Anil Nerode  and the relation  is thus referred to as Nerode congruence by some authors.

Proof

The proof of the "only if" part is as follows. Assume that a finite automaton recognizing  reads input , which leads to state . If  is another string read by the machine, also terminating in the same state , then clearly one has .

Clearly, this automaton recognizes . 

Thus, a language  is recognizable if and only if the set  is finite. Note that this proof also builds the minimal automaton.

Examples
 For the language , the minimal automaton has 4 states and the syntactic monoid has 15 elements.
 The bicyclic monoid is the syntactic monoid of the Dyck language (the language of balanced sets of parentheses).
(For , one can use the language of square powers of the letter.)
 Every non-trivial finite monoid is homomorphic to the syntactic monoid of some non-trivial language, but not every finite monoid is isomorphic to a syntactic monoid.
 Every finite group is isomorphic to the syntactic monoid of some regular language.
 Trace monoids are examples of syntactic monoids.
 Marcel-Paul Schützenberger characterized star-free languages as those with finite aperiodic syntactic monoids.

References

 
 
 
 
 
 

Formal languages
Semigroup theory